William Ngataiawhio Gray (23 December 1932 – 10 January 1993) was a New Zealand rugby union player. A second five-eighth, Gray represented  at a provincial level, and was a member of the New Zealand national side, the All Blacks, from 1955 to 1957. He played 11 matches for the All Blacks including six internationals.

Affiliating to Te Arawa and Tapuika, Gray was a New Zealand Maori representative and captain. In 1956, he was awarded the Tom French Cup for Māori rugby union player of the year.

An accomplished tennis player, Gray won the New Zealand Māori tennis championship in 1950.

References

1932 births
1993 deaths
People from Te Puke
People educated at Te Puke High School
New Zealand rugby union players
New Zealand international rugby union players
Bay of Plenty rugby union players
Māori All Blacks players
Rugby union centres
New Zealand male tennis players
Te Arawa people
Tapuika people
Rugby union players from the Bay of Plenty Region